Piet de Visser may refer to:

 Piet de Visser (football manager) (born 1934), Dutch football manager
 Piet de Visser (politician) (1931–2012), Dutch politician